Dorcadion litigiosum is a species of beetle in the family Cerambycidae. It was described by Ludwig Ganglbauer in 1884.

Subspecies
 Dorcadion litigiosum litigiosum (Ganglbauer, 1884)
 Dorcadion litigiosum ostshakovi Suvorov, 1913

References

litigiosum
Beetles described in 1884